Anne-Madeleine de Conty d'Argencourt (1637–1718), was a French courtier.

She was a maid of honour to Anne of Austria in 1657. She is known for her love affair with King Louis XIV of France in 1658. 

She fled France 1679 in the company of Olympe Mancini after having been implicated in the Affair of the Poisons.

References

1637 births
1718 deaths
French ladies-in-waiting
Mistresses of Louis XIV